is a former professional tennis player from Japan.

Biography
Born in Osaka, Yonezawa attended the University of Southwestern Louisiana, now known as UL Lafayette.

From 1981 to 1985 he competed in nine Davis Cup ties for Japan, including World Group relegation play-offs against France and Spain. All but one of his 10 Davis Cup matches came in doubles.

As a professional player he had his best performance at the Tokyo Outdoor in 1982, making the round of 16 of the Grand Prix tournament, with wins over Larry Stefanki and Morris Strode. He won a Sapporo Challenger event in 1986.

Yonezawa now works as a tennis coach and helped train Kei Nishikori when he was a junior.

Challenger titles

Singles: (1)

See also
List of Japan Davis Cup team representatives

References

External links
 
 
 

1958 births
Living people
Japanese male tennis players
Louisiana Ragin' Cajuns men's tennis players
20th-century Japanese people